Streptocarpus inconspicuus, synonym Saintpaulia inconspicua, is a species of Streptocarpus in the section Saintpaulia. It is a rare African violet, found in the Uluguru Mountains in Tanzania, East Africa. It was first formally described (in the genus Saintpaulia) in 1958. It is classed as an endangered species by the IUCN Red List.

References

inconspicua
House plants
Plants described in 1958
Endemic flora of Tanzania